"What If" is a song by Ashley Tisdale from her second studio album, Guilty Pleasure. It was released on July 7, 2009 as part of an iTunes Store countdown in promotion for the album.

Song information
This song was co-written by Tisdale, Kara DioGuardi and the Swedish production team Twin. Tisdale described "What If" as the most personal track on the album and said the song "is about when you’re in a relationship and you say 'If I really needed you, would you actually be there?’" It was released as part of the Guilty Pleasure countdown on iTunes on July 7, 2009 in the United States and Canada.

Critical reception
Rudy Klapper from Sputnikmusic said the "cheese factor in What If is almost unbearably high" and that the song contained "high-school journal lyrics". Bill Lamb from About.com stated that the song "wants to evolve into an Avril Lavigne ballad but ultimately drowns in too many lyrical "babys" and polished string-based crescendos.

Charts

Release details

References

2009 songs
Ashley Tisdale songs
Songs written by Kara DioGuardi
Songs written by Niclas Molinder
Songs written by Joacim Persson
Songs written by Johan Alkenäs
Songs written by David Jassy